The quantum clock model is a quantum lattice model. It is a generalisation of the transverse-field Ising model . It is defined on a lattice with  states on each site. The Hamiltonian of this model is

 and 

The model obeys a global  symmetry, which is generated by the unitary operator  where the product is over every site of the lattice. In other words,  commutes with the Hamiltonian.

When  the quantum clock model is identical to the transverse-field Ising model. When  the quantum clock model is equivalent to the quantum three-state Potts model. When , the model is again equivalent to the Ising model. When , strong evidences have been found that the phase transitions exhibited in these models should be certain generalizations  of Kosterlitz–Thouless transition, whose physical nature is still largely unknown.

One-dimensional model 

There are various analytical methods that can be used to study the quantum clock model specifically in one dimension.

Kramers–Wannier duality 

A nonlocal mapping of clock matrices known as the Kramers–Wannier duality transformation can be done as follows:

Then, in terms of the newly defined clock matrices with tildes, which obey the same algebraic relations as the original clock matrices, the Hamiltonian is simply . This indicates that the model with coupling parameter  is dual to the model with coupling parameter , and establishes a duality between the ordered phase and the disordered phase.

Note that there are some subtle considerations at the boundaries of the one dimensional chain; as a result of these, the degeneracy and  symmetry properties of phases are changed under the Kramers–Wannier duality. A more careful analysis involves coupling the theory to a  gauge field; fixing the gauge reproduces the results of the Kramers Wannier transformation.

Phase transition 
The model is said to be "self-dual" because Kramers–Wannier transformation transforms the Hamiltonian to itself. Strong evidences have been found that these phase transitions should be a class of generalizations of Kosterlitz–Thouless transition. The physical pictures of these phase transitions are still not clear.

Jordan–Wigner transformation 

Another nonlocal mapping known as the Jordan Wigner transformation can be used to express the theory in terms of parafermions.

References

Mathematical modeling
Quantum lattice models